is a Japanese industrial designer, illustrator, and managing director of the industrial design company . He also works as a design consultant for Kyushu Railway Company (JR Kyushu).

Biography 
Mitooka graduated from Okayama Technical High School in 1965.

After graduating from high school, Mitooka worked at Studio Silvo Coppola in Italy before founding Don Design Associates in 1972. The company oversees design projects for buildings, interiors, railway vehicles, graphics, and products.

In October 2011, Mitooka was awarded the 59th Kikuchi Kan Prize, presented annually by Bungei Shunju literary magazine and the Society for the Advancement of Japanese Culture.

Projects

JR Kyushu projects

 Kagoshima-Chuo Station (formerly Nishi-Kagoshima Station) building
 Kumamoto Station building
 787 series Tsubame electric multiple unit, 1993 Blue Ribbon Award winner
 883 series Sonic electric multiple unit, 1996 Blue Ribbon Award winner
 Yufuin no Mori II KiHa 72 diesel multiple unit train, 1999
 885 series Kamome electric multiple unit, 2001 Blue Ribbon Award winner
 Yufuin no Mori I KiHa 70 series diesel multiple unit train refurbishment, 2003
 Yufu DX KiHa 183 series diesel multiple unit train refurbishment, 2004
 Hayato no Kaze KiHa 47 series diesel multiple unit train refurbishment, 2004
 Trans-Kyushu Limited Express KiHa 185 series diesel multiple unit train refurbishment, 2004
 800 Series Shinkansen, 2005 Laurel Prize winner
 KiHa 125-400 series Umisachi Yamasachi train (in service from 10 October 2009)
 Ibusuki no Tamatebako diesel multiple unit train (in service from 2011)
 KiHa 185 series A-Train (in service from 8 October 2011)
 Seven Stars in Kyushu luxury excursion train (in service from October 2013)
 305 series EMU commuter trains for the Chikuhi Line (in service from February 2015)
 Aru Ressha luxury excursion train (in service from August 2015)
 BEC819 series battery EMU trains for the Fukuhoku Yutaka Line and Chikuhō Main Line (in service from October 2016)
 Kawasemi Yamasemi two-car diesel multiple unit tourist train conversion (in service from spring 2017)
 811 series EMU refurbishment from 2017

Fujikyu projects
 Fujikyu 1200 series Fuji Tozan Densha train refurbishment, 2009
 Fujikyuko Line Shimoyoshida Station renovation, 2009
 Fujikyuko Line Fujisan Station renovation, 2011
 Fujikyu 6000 series electric multiple unit (in service from February 2012)
 Fujikyu 8500 series Fujisan View Express train refurbishment, entering service in April 2016

Other railway projects
 Wakayama Electric Railway Kishigawa Line train refurbishment (from March 2006)
 Okayama Electric Tramway Momo tramcar
 Hisatsu Orange Railway Orange Restaurant Express tourist train (in service from March 2013)
 Kitakinki Tango Railway: Refurbishment of two KTR700 diesel cars (Akamatsu and Aomatsu) re-entering service from March 2013, at a cost of approximately 40 million yen
 Kumagawa Railroad Yunomae Line: Five diesel cars to be delivered in fiscal 2013 and 2014
 JR Shikoku  train refurbishment, returning to service from 5 October 2013
 Kitakinki Tango Railway: Refurbishment of KTR800 diesel car KTR803, re-entering service from 1 November 2013
 Shinano Railway: 115 series Rokumon tourist train conversion
 Kyoto Tango Railway: Rebuilding two two-car KTR8000 Tango Discovery DMU sets to be renamed Tango no Umi during fiscal 2015
 Nagaragawa Railway: Rebuilding two Nagara 300 series diesel cars to become the Nagara sightseeing train, entering service in spring 2016
 Izukyu Corporation: Rebuilding of Alpha Resort 21 train to become The Royal Express sightseeing train, entering service in summer 2017
 Coto Coto Train: touristic train service run by the Heisei Chikuhō Railway Company in the Fukuoka Prefecture, opened in 2019.

Exhibitions
  Axis Gallery, Tokyo, 8–23 October 2011
  Art Tower Mito Contemporary Gallery, 7 July - 30 September 2012

Bibliography

References

External links
 "Traveling at Speed in High Style" Government of Japan Public Relations interview with Eiji Mitooka, August 2011

Japanese industrial designers
1947 births
Living people